Lige is a given name. Notable people with this name include:

 Lige Clarke (1942–1975), American LGBT activist, journalist and author
 Lige Conley (1897–1937), American actor of the silent era
 Lige Gardner (1846–1901), Texas gunfighter sketched in the book titled Pages from a Worker's Life by William Z
 Lige, Chinese name of Teodorico Pedrini, Italian priest and musician

See also
 Lige is also a Danish word similar to the English word like, and it thus appears on titles: